Mihail Șerban may refer to:

Mihail Șerban (biochemist) (1930–2004), Romanian biochemist
Mihail Șerban (writer) (1911–1994), Romanian prose writer